Sadakiyans or Sadakiya, Sadaqiya (صدقیه, ca. 770–827/8 A.D.) were a Kurdish Muslim dynasty ruling in northwestern Iran, centered at Urmia. The dynasty, originally a "Mawla" of Azd tribe, was founded by Sadaka ibn Ali, a local Kurdish chieftain, who engaged in skirmishes with Abbasid Caliph Abu Jafar Al-Mansur in 770. Together with his brothers, Sadaka was able to take control of large areas from Mosul as fars as Lake Urmia. According to Baladhuri, after taking Urmia he built several castles and further fortified it by digging a canal around it. He extended his dominion to include, Salmas, Ushno, Lajan, and Sindus in modern-day northwestern Iran.
During reign of Abbasid Harun al Rashid, Sadakiyans were able to further extend their dominion, and the governor of Tabriz  accepted their suzerainty. 
The successful expeditions by Sadakiyans horrified Abbasids, who subsequently sent a large army under command of a general known as Khazima. He could only occupy Maragha and soon was defeated by Sadakiyan forces.  
After Sadaka, his son Ali took power. Ali extended further their dominion.

Ali's son Sadaka II, better known as Zariq (Zardiq,  Zuraiq, Zarir), ruled between 209 and 212 A.H. (824–827/8 A.D.) Like his grandfather (Sadaqa), Zariq was a capable warlord. He contacted the Abbasids and claimed he was ready to battle Babak Khorramdin in return for his rule over Armenia and Azarbaijan. The Abbasid Caliph Al-Ma'mun accepted the deal and persuaded him to counter Babak Khorramdin who hid himself in the mountains of Azarbaijan. Zariq led his forces throughout Azarbaijan occasionally skirmishing with Babak's forces however unable to find Babak Khorramdin himself, he retreated back to Urmia and made plans to capture Mosul from the Abbasids.

In 211 A.H. Zariq sent an army to Mosul in order to recapture it. He was initially defeated, but attacked again with a force of forty thousand troops, captured Mosul, and killed Sayid ibn Yunus Azdi. This angered Al-Ma'mun; he sent an Abbasid army to Mosul under the command of Muhammad ibn Humaid.  Finally, Zuraiq was defeated; he was executed in 212 after Ramadan (ca. 827–28 AD). After the death of Zariq, the Sadakiyan dynasty came to an end and Mosul was put under an Abbasid governor.

References

History of Kurdistan
Kurdish dynasties